Guillaume Radot (1911–1977) was a French screenwriter, producer and film director.

Selected filmography
 The Wolf of the Malveneurs (1943)
 Lawless Roads (1947)
 The Wolf (1949)
 Cartouche, King of Paris (1950)

References

Bibliography 
 Klossner, Michael. The Europe of 1500-1815 on Film and Television: A Worldwide Filmography of Over 2550 Works, 1895 Through 2000. McFarland & Company, 2002.

External links 
 

1911 births
1977 deaths
20th-century French screenwriters
French film producers
Film directors from Paris